Yoakum is a city in Lavaca and DeWitt counties in the U.S. state of Texas. The population was 5,908 at the 2020 census.

History
The area was sparsely settled until a townsite was laid out with the construction of the San Antonio and Aransas Pass Railway in 1887, and named for Benjamin F. Yoakum, a vice president of the line.  The railroad built a roundhouse and maintenance shops there, employing hundreds of workers.  The town was incorporated in 1889.  According to the Handbook of Texas Online, "By 1896 Yoakum had a cotton mill, three cotton gins, a compress, several churches, a bank, an ice factory, specialty and general stores, two weekly newspapers and one daily, a school system with 700 pupils, and a population of 3,000. By 1914 the number of residents had reached 7,500."  In the early 20th century, the Tex-Tan company, later part of the Tandy Corporation, manufactured saddles, bridles, harnesses, belts, and wallets.  Other industries included a dairy, a cannery, meat-packing and food-processing plants, and a metalworking shop.  Beginning in 1926, tomato farming in the surrounding area became a major agricultural business, with Yoakum being known as "the tomato capital of south central Texas."

Geography
Yoakum is located on the border of Lavaca and DeWitt counties at  (29.291052, -97.147315). U.S. Route 77 Alternate forms the northwest boundary of the city and leads northeast  to Hallettsville and southwest  to Cuero. Texas State Highway 111 passes through the center of Yoakum, leading southeast  to Edna and west  to Hochheim. Texas State Highway 95 leaves US 77A at the north end of Yoakum and leads north  to Shiner.

Demographics

As of the 2020 United States census, there were 5,908 people, 2,102 households, and 1,485 families residing in the city.

As of the census of 2000, 5,731 people, 2,156 households, and 1,515 families resided in the city. The population density was 1,256.2 people per square mile (485.3/km). The 2,529 housing units averaged 554.3 per square mile (214.1/km). The racial makeup of the city was 73.29% White, 11.88% African American, 0.38% Native American, 0.17% Asian, 0.05% Pacific Islander, 12.41% from other races, and 1.81% from two or more races. Hispanics or Latinos of any race were 33.89% of the population.

Of the 2,156 households, 35.7% had children under the age of 18 living with them, 49.3% were married couples living together, 15.7% had a female householder with no husband present, and 29.7% were not families. About 26.8% of all households were made up of individuals, and 15.0% had someone living alone who was 65 years of age or older. The average household size was 2.61 and the average family size was 3.15.

In the city, the population was distributed as 29.1% under the age of 18, 9.0% from 18 to 24, 24.8% from 25 to 44, 19.8% from 45 to 64, and 17.2% who were 65 years of age or older. The median age was 35 years. For every 100 females, there were 90.8 males. For every 100 females age 18 and over, there were 85.0 males.

The median income for a household in the city was $25,680, and for a family was $30,556. Males had a median income of $23,226 versus $15,594 for females. The per capita income for the city was $14,835. About 16.0% of families and 20.6% of the population were below the poverty line, including 28.4% of those under age 18 and 16.7% of those age 65 or over.

Notable people

 Carl St. Clair, music director of the Pacific Symphony Orchestra
 Pappy Daily, country music producer
 Wayne Graham, Major League Baseball player and baseball coach at Rice University
 Charlie Hall, linebacker for Cleveland Browns and University of Houston
 Hubert Renfro Knickerbocker, Pulitzer Prize-winning journalist and author
 Obert Logan, former NFL safety for the Dallas Cowboys and the New Orleans Saints
 Inez Beverly Prosser, pioneering educator and psychologist, first African-American female to receive a PhD in psychology
 Ryan Wagner, relief pitcher for the Cincinnati Reds and the Washington Nationals

Climate
The climate in this area is characterized by hot, humid summers and generally mild to cool winters. According to the Köppen climate classification, Yoakum has a humid subtropical climate, Cfa on climate maps.

Media and journalism
 Yoakum Herald-Times, area newspaper

References

External links
 
 
 Yoakum Chamber of Commerce
 Orozco-Vallejo, Mary M.  "Yoakum, Benjamin Franklin," Handbook of Texas Online, Texas State Historical Association.

 
Cities in DeWitt County, Texas
Cities in Lavaca County, Texas
Cities in Texas